Mulbarton could refer to:

Mulbarton, Norfolk, United Kingdom
Mulbarton, Gauteng, South Africa